The Archdiocese of Poznań is one of 14 archdioceses located in Poland, with the seat located in Poznań.

History
 968: Established as Missionary Diocese of Poland with seat in Poznań subordinated directly to the Holy See
 1000: Transformed to Diocese of Poznań subordinated directly to the Holy See
11th–12th century: Subordination of Diocese of Poznań to Metropolitan Archdiocese of Gniezno as suffragan diocese
 16 July 1821: Raised to status of Metropolitan Archdiocese and joined with Archdiocese of Gniezno in personal union in aeque principaliter.
 12 November 1948: dissolution of union between Archdioceses of Poznań and Gniezno as Primate of Poland Cardinal August Hlond appointed ordinary of the Archdioceses of Warsaw and Gniezno.

Special churches

 Minor Basilicas:
 Archicathedral Basilica of St. Peter and St. Paul, Poznań
 Basilica on the Holy Mountain, Głogówko

Suffragan dioceses
 Kalisz

Seminaries 

 Archbishop's Theological Seminary
 Society of Christ Major Seminary

See also
Bishops of Poznań
Roman Catholicism in Poland

Sources
 GCatholic.org
 Catholic Hierarchy
  Diocese website

Poznan
10th-century establishments in Poland
Poznan
Religious organizations established in the 960s